Somerley Mill is a grade II listed smock mill at Earnley, Sussex, England, which is under restoration.

History

Somerley Mill, was first mentioned in 1803. It was raised in 1827, with a brick base being built under the mill. It was working until 1942.  Currently, only the tower stands, the cap having been removed and a temporary roof placed over the top of the smock.

Description

Somerley Mill is a three-storey smock mill on a single-storey brick base. It had a Beehive cap and was winded by a fantail. When working it had two Common sails and two Spring sails. The mill drove two pairs of overdrift millstones, with a third pair worked by engine.

Millers
Ellis - 1942

References for above:-

References

External links
Windmill World Page on Earnley Windmill.

 Online version

Towers completed in the 1800s
Smock mills in England
Grinding mills in the United Kingdom
Grade II listed buildings in West Sussex
Windmills in West Sussex
Octagonal buildings in the United Kingdom